Columbus-III was a transatlantic telecommunications cable connecting Europe to North America.

History and details
Columbus-III entered service since December 1999 and it's owned by over 30 carriers. Supported by 90 repeaters, it's 9833 km long.

After a 2009 upgrade, the capacity of the system between the United States and Portugal was increased to 160 Gbit/s initially. The upgraded system could accommodate up to 320 Gbit/s with potential to go even further beyond.

References

External links

Infrastructure completed in 1999
Submarine communications cables in the Mediterranean Sea
Submarine communications cables in the North Atlantic Ocean
Transatlantic communications cables
1999 establishments in Florida
1999 establishments in Portugal
1999 establishments in Spain
1999 establishments in Italy